Buddhism has interacted with several Eastern religions such as Taoism, Shinto and Bon since it spread from the Indian subcontinent during the 2nd century AD.

Taoism

The relationships between Taoism and Buddhism are complex, as they influenced each other in many ways while often competing for influence. Taoism in its early form was a mixture of early mythology, folk religion, and Taoist philosophy. The arrival of Buddhism forced Taoism to renew and restructure itself into a more organized religion, while addressing similar existential questions raised by Buddhism. Early Buddhism was sometimes seen as a kind of foreign relative of Taoism and its scriptures were often translated into Chinese with Taoist vocabulary. Chan Buddhism in particular holds many beliefs in common with philosophical Taoism.
The coexistence of Chinese Buddhism and Taoism has also resulted in various Buddhist deities being adopted into the Taoist pantheon, and vice versa. For example, in Taoism, the Chinese Buddhist deva and Bodhisattva Marici is often syncretized with the Taoist goddess Doumu, who is regarded as the personification of the Big Dipper as well as the feminine aspect of the cosmic God of Heaven. In another example, the Taoist god of war and fraternity, Guan Yu, has been adopted by Buddhism and he is widely venerated as Sangharama Bodhisattva (伽蓝菩萨; 伽藍菩薩; Qiélán Púsà), a Bodhisattva or deva who serves as a dharmapala of Buddhist monasteries. According to Buddhist legends, in 592, the spirit of Guan Yu manifested himself one night before the Chan master Zhiyi and requested the master to teach him about the dharma. After receiving Buddhist teachings from the master, Guan Yu took refuge in the triple gems and also requested the Five Precepts, making a vow to become a guardian of temples and the dharma. The syncretism between Chinese Esoteric Buddhism and Taoism was particularly extensive. For instance, the nine-fold configuration of the Mandala of the Two Realms in Zhenyan and Shingon Buddhism was influenced and adopted from the Taoist Lo Shu Square and the I Ching.

Confucianism

Confucianism in particular raised fierce opposition to Buddhism in early history, principally because it perceived Buddhism to be a nihilistic worldview, with a negative impact on society at large. "The Neo-Confucianists
had therefore to attack Buddhist cosmological views by affirming, in the
firstplace, the reality and concreteness of the universe and of man."

Shinto

In the Japanese religion of Shinto, the long coexistence of Buddhism and Shinto resulted in the merging of Shinto and Buddhism. Gods in Shinto were given a position similar to that of Hindu gods in Buddhism.  Moreover, because the Buddha Vairochana's symbol was the sun, many equated Amaterasu, the sun goddess, as his previous bodhisattva reincarnation. According to Helen Hardacre, by the Heian period, a theory named wakō dōjin (和光同塵) had emerged. The Buddha and Kami had taken on a new form as saviors of man, who "dim their light and mingle with the dust of the world". This not only relates the two religions, but demonstrates a marked difference in status between the two deities at this period in time. The later Tokugawa Shogunate era saw a revival of Shinto, and some Shinto scholars began to argue that Buddhas were previous incarnations of Shinto gods, reversing the traditional positions of the two religions. Shinto and Buddhism were officially separated during the Meiji Restoration and the brief, but socially transformative rise of State Shinto followed. In post-war modern Japan, most families count themselves as being of both religions, despite the idea of "official separation".
In addition, Buddhism played an important part in the religious legitimation of Japanese emperors via Shinto.It is noteworthy that the Sui were the first Chinese dynasty with which the newly emergent centralising Japanese state came into contact, so the practice of using Buddhism as an officially sanctioned religion would have been demonstrated to the Japanese as a political reality.The interplay between Taoism, Buddhism, and Shinto in China and Japan stimulated the adoption of the Chinese practice of state-sanctioned religion and religious legitimation through association with divinity by the Japanese government. The official implementation of the term tennō (天皇) to refer to the Japanese emperor is also widely agreed to take place during the latter part of the 7th century, as a result of these interactions.

Muism

When Buddhism was introduced in Korea, its temples were built on or near the shaman mountain-spirit shrines. Still today, one can see buildings at these Buddhist temple sites dedicated to the shaman mountain-spirits Sansin (Korean: 산신). Most buddhist temples in Korea have a Sansin-gak (Korean: 산신각), the choice of preference over other shrines, typically a small shrine room set behind and to the side of the other buildings. It is also common for the sansingak to be at a higher elevation than the other shrine rooms, just as the mountain itself towers above the temple complex. The sansin-gak maybe a traditional wooden structure with a tile roof, or in more modern and less wealth temples, a more simple and utilitarian room. Inside will be a waist height shrine with either a statue and mural painting, or just a mural painting. Offerings of candles, incense, water and fruit are commonly supplemented with alcoholic drinks, particularly Korea’s rustic rice wine makgeolli. This further serves to illustrate the non-Buddhist nature of this deity, even when he resides inside a temple. And yet, on the floor of this small shine room one will frequently see a monk’s cushion and moktak: evidence of the regular Buddhist ceremonies held there. Sansin may not be enshrined in a separate shrine, but in a Samseonggak or in the Buddha hall, to one side of the main shrine. Sansin shrines can also be found independent of Buddhist temples.

Hinduism 

Having both originated from the same place, Hinduism and Buddhism have shared India and influenced each other over centuries.

Origin & Caste System 
Both Hinduism and Buddhism originate from India but they hold separate beliefs. As Knott states, Hindus describe the origin of their religion as sanatana dharma claiming that it goes past human origin and can now be found in scriptures of the Vedas. The Vedas, mentioned then introduce the concept of a caste system in order to reach enlightenment or moksha. The Brahmin class, which is the highest class, is the only class in Hinduism that can reach enlightenment, so through good karma and multiple lives through reincarnation, someone from a lower class can become a Brahmin and thus reach moksha/enlightenment. The caste system today still remains in place to help establish the Brahmin status and maintain a societal hierarchy which categorizes people. Despite both being from India, the religions' beliefs about reaching enlightenment and the caste system differ. Buddhism originated with the Buddha in India, who then spread his teachings. In regards to the caste system only Hinduism heavily relies on it. Buddhism, on the other hand, strays away from the caste system in their belief that anyone, not just Brahmins, can reach enlightenment no matter their ranking in the caste system. This differs from Hinduism, and today influences the relevance of the caste system in some societies as both Buddhism and Hinduism coexist in India. As a result, Buddhism has spread past India and is mainly in Eastern Asia, while Hinduism still remains majorly in India.

Jainism

See also
 Buddhism and Christianity
 Buddhism and Hinduism
 Buddhism and Tengrism 
 Buddhism and Jainism
 Buddhism and psychology
 Buddhism and science
 Buddhist ethics
 Buddhist philosophy
 God in Buddhism (Buddhism, mysticism, and monotheism)

References

Further reading
 Arthur F. Wright, (1971) Buddhism in Chinese History, Stanford University Press, Stanford California.
 Tang Yijie, (1991) Confucianism, Buddhism, Daoism, Christianity, and Chinese Culture, University of Peking, The Council for research in values and philosophy
 Christine Mollier, (2008) Buddhism and Taoism Face to Face: Scripture, Ritual, and Iconographic exchange in Medieval China, University of Hawaii Press.
 Fung Yu-Lan and Derk Bodde (1942),The Rise of Neo-Confucianism and Its Borrowings From Buddhism and Taoism, Harvard Journal of Asiatic Studies

External links
 Selfhood and Identity in Confucianism, Taoism, Buddhism, and Hinduism: Contrasts With the West
 The Influence of Confucianism and Buddhism on Chinese Business
 |Asian Religions -- An Introduction to the Study of Hinduism, Buddhism, Islam, Confucianism, and Tao
 BUDDHISM AND CONFUCIANISM IN CH'I-SUNG'S ESSAY ON TEACHING (YUAN-TAO)
 The Conception of Language And The Use of Paradox In Buddhism And Taoism
 Relations Among Confucianism, Buddhism and Taoism, and the Development of Chinese Buddhism
 The Fusion of Three Religions and the Self-adjustment of Northern Song's Demoted Literators
 A Study of the Syncretism of the Three Religions from the Evolvement of "Tao"
 An Analysis of How the Fusion of Confucianism, Buddhism and Taoism Reflects in Journey to the West

Eastern religions
Buddhism in East Asia